Eukaryotic translation initiation factor 4 gamma 3 is a protein that in humans is encoded by the EIF4G3 gene. The gene encodes a protein that functions in translation by aiding the assembly of the ribosome onto the messenger RNA template. Confusingly, this protein is usually referred to as eIF4GII, as although EIF4G3 is the third gene that is similar to eukaryotic translation initiation factor 4 gamma, the second isoform EIF4G2 is not an active translation initiation factor.

Interactions 

EIF4G3 has been shown to interact with PABPC1.

References

Further reading